Cornish Crabbers LLP is a British boat builder based in Rock, Cornwall. The company specializes in the design and manufacture of glassfibre gaff-rigged sailboats and powerboats. It was founded by boat designer Roger Dongray, as well as Peter Keeling and Ken Robertson in 1974.

The company is organized as a British limited liability partnership.

History

The company was formed as Westerly Boats and later renamed Cornish Crabbers. The first boat was the Cornish Crabber 24 Mark I, initially a wooden boat, later built in glassfibre.

The Cornish Shrimper 19 followed in 1979 and proved to be the company's best selling design. It is the also the best selling trailer sailer in Europe. Steve Henkel noted in his 2010 book, The Sailor's Book of Small Cruising Sailboats, "this is a character boat with concomitant grace, and with a good measure of performance and practicality, too. What she lacks in headroom, she makes up in charm. In England, she has cult-boat status." John Leather, writing in The Gaff Rig Handbook: History, Design, Techniques, Developments described it as "probably the most successful modern gaffer" (gaff-rigged boat).

By 2001 the company had established itself as the leading producer of gaff-rigged boats.

In 2021 the company was producing 12 sailboat designs and three powerboats in the Clam series.

Boats 
Summary of boats built by Cornish Crabbers:

Adventure 17
Adventure 19
Adventure 21
Adventure 26
Clam 17
Clam 19
Clam 21
Cornish Crabber 22
Cornish Crabber 24
Cornish Crabber 26
Cornish Shrimper 17 
Cornish Shrimper 19
Cornish Shrimper 21 
Cormorant 12 1984
Cornish Crabber Pilot 30
Cornish Crabber 17
Crabber 17
Limpet 10
Mystery 35
Mystery 30

See also
List of sailboat designers and manufacturers

References

External links

Cornish Crabbers